Frederick Lucas (30 March 1812 – 22 October 1855) was a British religious polemicist and founder of The Tablet. His brother Samuel Lucas was a newspaper editor and abolitionist.

Biography
He was born in Westminster, the second son of Samuel Hayhurst Lucas, a London corn-merchant, who was a member of the Society of Friends.  He was educated at a Quaker school in Darlington, and then at University College, London.  He studied law at Middle Temple, and was called to the bar in 1835.  Lucas converted to Catholicism in 1839.

In 1840, Lucas founded The Tablet, published in London, a progressive international Catholic weekly newspaper, just 11 years before the restoration of the Catholic hierarchy in England and Wales.  It is the second oldest surviving weekly journal in Britain after The Spectator (which was founded in 1828).  It has an international readership of over 55,000.

After establishing the Irish Tenant Right League with Charles Gavan Duffy in 1850, he was elected as Member of Parliament (MP) for Meath in 1852. After failing in a complaint-mission to Rome on behalf of the league, Lucas died in October 1855 at Staines, Middlesex, and is buried in Brompton Cemetery, London.

Notes

External links 
 

1812 births
1855 deaths
British publishers (people)
British male journalists
Burials at Brompton Cemetery
Members of the Parliament of the United Kingdom for County Meath constituencies (1801–1922)
Converts to Roman Catholicism from Quakerism
English Roman Catholics
UK MPs 1852–1857
19th-century British journalists
Male journalists
19th-century British businesspeople